East Hill may refer to:

 East Hill, Kent, England
 East Hill, a village amalgamated into Brome Lake, Quebec, Canada
 East Hill (Schoharie County, New York), an elevation
 East Hill, a mountain in Granite County, Montana

See also
 East Hills (disambiguation)